Meg Hutchinson (born 1978, in South Egremont, Massachusetts) is an American folk singer-songwriter.  Originally from rural westernmost Massachusetts, Hutchinson is now based in the Boston area. Influences include poet Mary Oliver, songwriter Shawn Colvin, and mood maker David Gray. She has won numerous songwriting awards in the US, Ireland and UK, including recognition from John Lennon Songwriting Contest, Billboard Song Contest and prestigious competitions at Merlefest, NewSong, Kerrville, Falcon Ridge, Telluride Bluegrass and Rocky Mountain Folks festivals.

She has been described as delivering "music as powerful as it is gentle".

Biography
Meg Hutchinson was raised by English teachers in a small town outside of Great Barrington, Massachusetts called South Egremont. Growing up in the Berkshires, the mountains, woods and ponds were her childhood muses, as were poets she read (like Mary Oliver, Robert Frost and William Butler Yeats), and the songwriters she listened to (like Greg Brown and Joni Mitchell). When she inherited her grandmother's 1957 Martin guitar at age eleven, her love of words found an inspiring instrument. "Songwriting is not something I chose, I've just somehow always known that this is what I love to do. This is what I can't help but do", she says.

After graduating from Bard College at Simon's Rock, with a BA in Liberal Arts with concentration in creative writing, Hutchinson quit her longtime job on an organic lettuce farm and settled in Boston, Massachusetts. In between gigs at pubs, coffeehouses and subway train stations, she won a Kerrville New Folk Award (2000) and was nominated for a Boston Music Award for her first studio album Against the Grey. She went on to win awards at the Rocky Mountain Folks Fest, the Telluride Troubadour Songwriter's Showcase in Colorado and The Chris Austin Songwriting Contest at Merlefest in North Carolina, all in the course of a year, causing national publications like Performing Songwriter to take notice, calling her "A master of introspective ballads filled with understated yearning and an exquisite sense of metaphor."

After recording her live CD Any Given Day in 2001, she went into the studio with producer Crit Harmon (Lori McKenna, Martin Sexton, Mary Gauthier) to record The Crossing. Released in 2004, this album was enthusiastically received by critics and DJs across the country, catching the attention of folk-roots label Red House Records. Label president and veteran producer Eric Peltoniemi said "Meg won me over with the profound yet easy depth of her lyrics—rich words married to melodies I just can't get out of my head." Peltoniemi signed Hutchinson to the label.

2008 Album Come Up Full

Come Up Full was Hutchinson's first release on Folk label Red House Records.  A record about encountering good things when you least expect them, Hutchinson's introduction to the Folk community was well-received within the genre.  The album includes the songs "Ready", "Home" and "Come Up Full" In "America (Enough)", Hutchinson explores American culture, excess and war by writing about how things taken to an extreme almost become their opposite. Another song on the new album is her "Song for Jeffrey Lucey", based on the real story of Lance Corporal Jeffrey Lucey, who returned from Iraq, suffering from post-traumatic stress disorder (PTSD).

2010 Album The Living Side

Upon the release of The Living Side, Hutchinson's second album on Red House Records, songwriter John Gorka said, "After you hear Meg, you feel you've been somewhere."

"I grew up in the country without a TV or internet," Hutchinson says. "There were so many quiet hours in the day. So many spaces between events. We have forgotten how to be alone in our thoughts. All the best work comes out of that rich stillness of waiting."

Discography

Solo albums

Singles
 "True North" (2007, studio version)

Collaborative albums
 Winterbloom: Traditions Rearranged (2009)
(with Antje Duvekot, Anne Heaton, and Natalia Zukerman)

References

External links
 

American folk singers
American folk musicians
Songwriters from Massachusetts
Singers from Massachusetts
People from Berkshire County, Massachusetts
1978 births
Living people
American women poets
Guitarists from Massachusetts
21st-century American women singers
21st-century American poets
21st-century American women guitarists
21st-century American guitarists
Red House Records artists
21st-century American singers